Achachi Qala (Aymara for "gigantic stone", also spelled Achachicala) is a  mountain in the Bolivian Andes. It is located in the La Paz Department, Loayza Province, Luribay Municipality.

References 

Mountains of La Paz Department (Bolivia)